Lycodryas cococola is a species of snakes of the family Pseudoxyrhophiidae.

Geographic range
Harmless to humans, the snake is found in Comoros.

References 

Reptiles described in 2012
Reptiles of the Comoros
Pseudoxyrhophiidae